Anglo Tignish is a settlement in Prince Edward Island.

Communities in Prince County, Prince Edward Island